is a Japanese footballer currently playing as a midfielder for Fagiano Okayama.

Career statistics

Club
.

Notes

References

External links

2001 births
Living people
Association football people from Okayama Prefecture
Japanese footballers
Association football midfielders
J2 League players
Fagiano Okayama players